An acting rank is a designation that allows a soldier to assume a military rank—usually higher and usually temporary. They may assume that rank either with or without the pay and allowances appropriate to that grade, depending on the nature of the acting promotion. An acting officer may be ordered back to the previous grade.  This situation may arise when a lower-ranking officer is called upon to replace a senior officer, or fill a position higher than the current rank held.

Address
When addressing an individual with an acting rank, the person should be addressed as if the full rank were held. For example, a member who is an acting master seaman would be addressed as "Master Seaman Smith", and not "Acting Master Seaman Smith" ("acting" is a designation, not a rank).  In writing, the acting nature of the rank may or may not be spelled out, so that forms such as "acting captain", "captain (acting)" or "captain" are used.  Documents dealing with rank, seniority and promotion will tend to spell out the acting nature of the rank, and informal documents will tend to avoid it, but there is no general rule.

Usage by United States

Use by US Navy 
In the United States Navy, acting appointments were common during the 19th century.  The number of commissioned naval officers at each rank in the Navy was fixed by Congress, so it was difficult to fill vacancies if the number of officers needed to man ships exceeded that fixed number of officers allowed by Congress.  Acting appointments were also common with warrant officers and ratings, although neither were subject to congressional approval and were simply temporary assignments.  
The regulations stated that in the United States, acting appointments were not allowed unless specifically authorized by the Department of the Navy.  In most other cases, only the commander-in-chief of a fleet or squadron would be authorized to appoint an officer to fill a vacancy, and this order would be subject to approval of the Department of the Navy.  In this way, the Department of the Navy was able to fill vacancies while the Navy grew before Congress took action to permanently increase the number of officers. Outside of the United States and not part of a fleet or squadron, the commanding officer of the ship was allowed to appoint officers to a higher rank in the case of death on board the ship.

The officer was temporarily appointed to the higher rank, appended "acting" to his new rank, wore the uniform of the higher rank, and was addressed and paid at the higher rank.  When the ship returned to the United States, or joined a fleet or squadron, the appointment was subject to review by the commander-in-chief of the fleet or squadron or the Department of the Navy.  

Another type of temporary appointment was an "order to perform".  This was issued in a similar manner to an acting appointment for a lower grade officer to perform the duties of a higher grade officer, except that their pay, rank and uniform remained at the lower grade.

Similar to the many brevet ranks in the Union Army, acting appointments were extremely common during the American Civil War.  Congress authorized the Department of the Navy to purchase vessels and appoint acting or volunteer officers to man them until the end of the conflict.  By the end of the War, most officers were appointed to a higher acting rank, and their appointments lasted until the end of the war at which point many were discharged from the Navy.

See also
Brevet (military)
Frocking
Battlefield promotion
Rising from the ranks

References

Military ranks
Naval ranks
Military ranks of the United States Navy